Dalim Tango was a color retouching package aimed at the repro and prepress markets. It ran on Silicon Graphics workstations, and was first released in 1993. This retouching package is still available in the DALiM LiTHO program. As of 2013, LiTHO version 7 is available for both Linux and Mac OS X operating systems.

Features
Tango had tools for retouching, creative painting, image manipulation and "merging" different images. It supported the standard CMYK, RGB, CIELAB and HLS color spaces. Users could also work in a CMYK++ mode, which added special inks to the standard four-color CMYK palette, somewhat similar to the InkSwitch module of Barco Creator. A software densitometer with unlimited sample sites was also included.

Tango 2.0 could open TIFF, Scitex CT and Dalim native formats.

See also
Barco Creator
Barco ColorTone
Linotype-Hell DaVinci

External links
Dalim Software GmbH

Raster graphics editors
IRIX software
Technical communication tools